Lord Patten may refer to:

 Chris Patten, Baron Patten of Barnes (born 1944), Conservative politician, Governor of Hong Kong and Chancellor of the University of Oxford
 John Patten, Baron Patten (born 1945), Conservative politician, Secretary of State for Education